German submarine U-566 was a Type VIIC U-boat of Nazi Germany's Kriegsmarine during World War II. The submarine was laid down on 30 March 1940 at the Blohm & Voss yard in Hamburg as yard number 542, launched on 20 February 1941 and commissioned on 17 April under the command of Kapitänleutnant Dietrich Borchert.

She was scuttled by her crew on 24 October 1943 after being damaged by six depth charges from a British Wellington aircraft in the North Atlantic west of Portugal, in position . There were no casualties.

Design
German Type VIIC submarines were preceded by the shorter Type VIIB submarines. U-566 had a displacement of  when at the surface and  while submerged. She had two shafts and two  propellers.

U-566 was fitted with five  torpedo tubes (four fitted at the bow and one at the stern), fourteen torpedoes, one  SK C/35 naval gun, 220 rounds, and a  C/30 anti-aircraft gun. The boat had a complement of between forty-four and sixty.

Service history
In the eleven combat patrols of her career the U-boat sank seven vessels; six merchant ships totalling  between February and November 1942, and the 2,265 tons patrol gunboat  on 5 August 1943.

She was initially involved in a short journey from Trondheim to Kirkenes, both in Norway in July 1941.

First and second patrols

The submarine's first and second patrols were marked by no more than an unsuccessful attack by a Soviet submarine off Kildin Island which caused no damage.
 
Before her third patrol, she moved between Kirkenes, Bergen and Kristiansand from September to December 1941.

Third, fourth and fifth patrols
The boat's third patrol took her from Kristiansand to Lorient in occupied France where she arrived on 23 December 1941. Her route took her through the gap between the Faroe and Shetland Islands, west of Ireland and into the Bay of Biscay.

The U-boat's fifth patrol commenced with her departure from Brest, which she continued to use for the rest of her career, on 8 April 1942.

Sixth, seventh and eighth patrols
Her sixth outing saw the sinking of the Triton northeast of the Azores on 17 August 1942 and the Zuiderkerk on 28 August.

The boat's seventh foray was rewarded with the sinking of the Glenlea on 7 November in mid-Atlantic, but she was attacked and severely damaged by a Hudson of No. 233 Squadron RAF on 17 November 1942, forcing the U-boat to abort her patrol.

Her eighth patrol was fruitless.

Ninth patrol
On 26 April 1943 she was disabled by a British Leigh light-equipped Wellington of 172 Squadron. The damage was such (including an untraceable oil leak), that she was unable to dive and had to be escorted back to base.

Tenth patrol
Her AA fire forced the aircraft to ditch (she had misidentified the aircraft as a B-25 Mitchell). She also shot a second Ventura down (also wrongly categorized as a Mitchell) after it and a Martin Mariner both attacked, without result.

Eleventh patrol
The boat was scuttled on 24 October 1943 after she came off worse with an encounter with a Wellington of 179 Squadron. The submarine's crew were picked up by a Spanish trawler and briefly interned. They survived the war and in 1970 met the aircrew who had been victorious.

Wolfpacks
U-566 took part in six wolfpacks, namely:
 Pfadfinder (21 – 27 May 1942)
 Blücher (14 – 28 August 1942)
 Natter (2 – 8 November 1942)
 Westwall (8 – 22 November 1942)
 Neptun (18 February – 3 March 1943)
 Westmark (6 – 11 March 1943)

Summary of raiding history

References

Notes

Citations

Bibliography

External links

German Type VIIC submarines
U-boats commissioned in 1941
World War II submarines of Germany
World War II shipwrecks in the Atlantic Ocean
1941 ships
Ships built in Hamburg
U-boats scuttled in 1943
Ships sunk with no fatalities
Maritime incidents in October 1943